The canton of Mazamet-2 Vallée du Thoré is an administrative division of the Tarn department, southern France. It was created at the French canton reorganisation which came into effect in March 2015. Its seat is in Mazamet.

It consists of the following communes:
 
Albine
Bout-du-Pont-de-Larn
Labastide-Rouairoux
Lacabarède
Mazamet (partly)
Pont-de-Larn
Le Rialet
Rouairoux
Saint-Amans-Soult
Saint-Amans-Valtoret
Sauveterre
Le Vintrou

References

Cantons of Tarn (department)